CT Rail, stylized as CTrail, is the brand for commuter rail services overseen by the Connecticut Department of Transportation (CTDOT), in the U.S. state of Connecticut, with some service extending into Massachusetts. CTDOT oversees two lines: Shore Line East, between New Haven and New London, Connecticut, and the Hartford Line, from New Haven, through Hartford, to Springfield, Massachusetts.

Services are operated under contract, with Shore Line East operated by Amtrak along the Northeast Corridor, and the Hartford Line operated by a joint venture of TransitAmerica Services and Alternate Concepts. CT Rail trains, along with other CTDOT rail operations, use the reporting mark CNDX.

Lines 
CT Rail operates two commuter rail lines: the Hartford Line and Shore Line East. Both lines utilize portions of the Northeast Corridor, with most trains terminating at Union Station in New Haven.

Hartford Line 

The Hartford Line runs between New Haven Union Station in New Haven and Springfield Union Station in Springfield. The line is a joint venture between the Connecticut Department of Transportation and the Massachusetts Department of Transportation (MassDOT). Service began on June 16, 2018. CT Rail Hartford Line tickets are also accepted on Amtrak's Hartford Line, however, the Vermonter inter-city service does not participate despite running along the same route. The majority of the Hartford Line's route is along the New Haven–Springfield Line, with two stations in New Haven, Union Station and State Street, being on the Northeast Corridor.

Shore Line East 

CT Rail's Shore Line East commuter rail service runs between New London and New Haven, with limited service continuing onto Bridgeport and Stamford. When service initially started along the line on May 29, 1990, CT Rail commuter trains were intended to be a temporary measure in order to reduce congestion along Interstate 95 during a highway construction project. However, the service was made permanent due to more ridership than initially anticipated. The line has an average daily ridership of about 2,100 riders and runs along the Northeast Corridor for its entire length. Since May 2022, Shore Line East has used Kawasaki M8 electric multiple units to provide service on the line.

Rolling stock

Current
CT Rail uses the following rolling stock for its commuter rail operations:

Future rolling stock
There are plans to buy new equipment for the Hartford Line as a bulk purchase with Metro-North Railroad's Danbury and Waterbury branches after about five years of operation, although replacing the leased equipment with the current SLE coaches that will be displaced by the M8s remains an option. A study is currently underway studying on electrification on the Hartford Line as well as the Waterbury and Danbury branches.

See also 
 Metro-North Railroad
 List of United States commuter rail systems by ridership
 Connecticut Commuter Rail Council

References 

Commuter rail in the United States
Connecticut railroads
Passenger rail transportation in Connecticut